New Castle Municipal Airport  is a small municipal airport located in Union Township, Lawrence County, Pennsylvania serving Lawrence County, Pennsylvania, part of the Pittsburgh metropolitan area. Union Township is an outskirt of New Castle, Pennsylvania hence the name. The airport is located four nautical miles (7 km) northwest of the central business district of New Castle. The airport is a public-owned airport and is controlled by the Lawrence County Airport Authority.

This airport is assigned a three-letter location identifier of UCP by the Federal Aviation Administration, but it does not have an International Air Transport Association (IATA) airport code.

Facilities and aircraft 
It has two asphalt paved runways: 5/23 is 3,995 by 75 feet (1,218 x 23 m) and 13/31 is 2,745 by 100 feet (837 x 30 m).

The airport's fixed-base operator (FBO) is Haski Aviation.

For the 12-month period ending February 28, 2009, the airport had 35,357 aircraft operations, an average of 96 per day: 97% general aviation, 3% air taxi and <1% military. At that time there were 58 aircraft based at this airport: 96% single-engine, 2% multi-engine and 2% helicopter.

References

External links 

 New Castle Municipal Airport (UCP) at PennDOT Bureau of Aviation
 

Airports in Pennsylvania
County airports in Pennsylvania
Transportation buildings and structures in Lawrence County, Pennsylvania